Normande is a Canadian drama film from Quebec, directed by Gilles Carle and released in 1975. The film stars Carole Laure as the titular Normande St-Onge, a woman who is slowly losing her grip on reality as her difficult circumstances lead her to retreat into a fantasy world.

The film's cast also includes Raymond Cloutier, Reynald Bouchard, Carmen Giroux and Denys Arcand.

Lewis Furey won the Canadian Film Award for Best Musical Score at the 27th Canadian Film Awards for his work on the film. The film was also a nominee for Best Feature Film, but did not win.

References

External links 
 

1975 films
1975 drama films
1970s French-language films
Films directed by Gilles Carle
Films set in Quebec
Films shot in Quebec
French-language Canadian films
1970s Canadian films
Canadian drama films